Myron T. Steele is the former Chief Justice of the Delaware Supreme Court. First appointed to the court in 2000, Steele was elevated to the position of Chief Justice in 2004.

Steele received a J.D. from the University of Virginia School of Law in 1970, and an LL.M. from the same institution in 2005. He served as adjunct professor of law at University of Pennsylvania Law School from 2009–2013.

References

Living people
University of Virginia School of Law alumni
Chief Justices of Delaware
Year of birth missing (living people)
University of Pennsylvania Law School faculty